Four athletes from East Timor, at the time under United Nations administration, competed as individual Olympic athletes at the 2000 Summer Olympics in Sydney, Australia.

Results by event

Athletics

Track and road events

Boxing

Weightlifting

Men

See also
 Individual Paralympic Athletes at the 2000 Summer Paralympics

References

 
 
 
 
 
 International Olympic Committee website

2000, Independent
Nations at the 2000 Summer Olympics
2000